Rochebaucourt is a former municipality in the Canadian province of Quebec, located in the Abitibi Regional County Municipality. In 2023, it was merged with La Morandière to from the new Municipality of La Morandière-Rochebaucourt.

History

In 1935 as part of the Vautrin Settlement Plan, the place was colonized by pioneers from Saint-Antoine-sur-Richelieu, Saint-Hyacinthe, and Salaberry-de-Valleyfield. It was first known as Colonie-33 but this was quickly replaced by Rochebaucourt, the name of the geographic township in which it is located. La Rochebaucourt was a cavalry captain of the Régiment de Languedoc in General Montcalm's army. In 1940, the Parish of Saint-Antoine-de-Rochebaucourt was established.

Not until 1983 was the place incorporated as a municipality.

Demographics

Mother tongue:
 English as first language: 0%
 French as first language: 100%
 English and French as first language: 0%
 Other as first language: 0%

Political representation 

Provincially it is part of the riding of Abitibi-Ouest. In the 2022 Quebec general election the incumbent MNA Suzanne Blais, of the Coalition Avenir Québec, was re-elected to represent the population of Rochebaucourt in the National Assembly of Quebec.

Federally, Rochebaucourt is part of the federal riding of Abitibi—Témiscamingue. In the 2021 Canadian federal election, the incumbent Sébastien Lemire of the Bloc Québécois was re-elected to represent the population Rochebaucourt in the House of Commons of Canada.

References

Municipalities in Quebec
Incorporated places in Abitibi-Témiscamingue